Leptopomoides is a genus of air-breathing land snails, terrestrial pulmonate gastropod mollusks in the family Cyclophoridae. These snails are restricted to Western Ghats of India and Sri Lanka.

Seven species are recognized.

Species
 Leptopomoides conulus (Pfeiffer, 1855)
 Leptopomoides flammeus (Pfeiffer, 1855)
 Leptopomoides halophilus (W.H. Benson, 1851)
 Leptopomoides orophilus (W.H. Benson, 1853)
 Leptopomoides poecilus (Pfeiffer, 1855)
 Leptopomoides taprobanensis (Peston, 1909)
 Leptopomoides valvatus (O.F. von Möllendorff, 1897)

References